Monographic series (alternatively, monographs in series) are scholarly and scientific books released in successive volumes, each of which is structured like a separate book or scholarly monograph.

Semantics
In general books that are released serially (in successive parts) once a year, or less often, are called series. Publications that are released more often than once a year are known as periodicals. If the volumes can each stand on their own as a separate book, they are called monographs in series; if not, they are called "book sets".

Associations
The connection among books belonging to such a series can be by discipline, focus, approach, type of work, or geographic location. Examples of such series include "Antwerp Working Papers in Linguistics"; "Early English Manuscripts in Facsimile" (Rosenkilde & Bagger, Copenhagen); Garland reference library; "Canterbury Tales Project"  (see The Canterbury Tales); Early English Text Society.

The Library of Anglo-Catholic Theology (a series of 19th-century editions of theological works by Church of England writers, devoted to significant Anglo-Catholic figures, published by John Henry Parker) is an example of a common usage in naming monographic series; another example is the John Harvard Library which consists of notable works relating to the United States. The Loeb Classical Library is a series of editions of Greek and Latin texts in which the original texts are accompanied by translations into English; the series was begun by James Loeb and is published by Harvard University Press, Cambridge, Massachusetts Series intended for general readers may also have "library" in their titles, e.g. Everyman's Library.

Categorization
Libraries and indexing services handle them in various ways. The Library of Congress catalogs each part of them as an individual book with an individual call number and ISBN and a series note (technically a series added entry for the overall series, which has its ISSN, and usually a call number. As the Library of Congress receives two copies of most scholarly books as copyright deposits, it normally keeps one by individual call number and one by series call number. Most other libraries do not have that luxury and have to choose. The Anglo-American Cataloging Rules 2nd edition allows either of these options to be used.

Medical libraries almost always keep them together as a series. The biomedical indexing service PubMed from the National Library of Medicine treat the individual volumes in such a series as if they were volumes in a journal.

 Advances in Experimental Medicine and Biology

Themed volumes
In many cases each volume in such a series itself contains individual chapters or articles written by different authors, usually on the same general theme. The Library of Congress does not list each such article separately, but PubMed does.

A frequent occasion for such a themed volume is a celebration in honor of a person's scholarly work. If done at retirement or on an anniversary (e.g. 60th birthday), it is usually called a Festschrift or celebration volume. If after death, it is usually called a memorial.

The publisher Variorum Reprints began publishing its Collected Studies series in 1970. Each of these volumes contains "a selection of articles by a leading authority on a particular subject ... reprinted from a vast range of learned journals, Festschrifts, conference proceedings ...". These volumes are published by Ashgate Publications.

See also

 Book series
 Collection (publishing)
 Serials, periodicals and journals
 Academic publishing
 Edited volume

References 

 
Academic publishing
Books by type